Chromolaena ivifolia called ivy-leaf false thoroughwort, or ivyleaf thoroughwort, is a species of flowering shrub in the family Asteraceae. It is native to North America and South America, from the south-eastern United States (eastern Texas, Louisiana, southern Mississippi, southern Alabama, and Florida) to Argentina.

Chromolaena ivifolia is a perennial herb or subshrub up to 150 cm (5 feet) tall. Flower heads are produced in groups at the ends of branches. The heads contain red, purple, or blue disc florets but no ray florets.

References

External links
Photo of herbarium specimen at Missouri Botanical Garden, collected in Minas Gerais, Brazil
Southeastern Flora
Alabama Plant Atlas
Plants of the Eastern Caribbean
Instituto de Botánica Darwinion
Flora de la República Argentina

ivifolia
Flora of the Caribbean
Flora of North America
Flora of South America
Flora of Central America
Plants described in 1759
Flora without expected TNC conservation status